Starfield is a chain of shopping malls under the Shinsegae Group.

Branches

References

External links
 

Shinsegae Group
Shopping malls in South Korea